Avtandil Gvianidze (born 23 August 1974) is a retired Georgian professional football forward, who played for several clubs in Europe.

Club career
Gvianidze played in Ukraine for FC Nyva Ternopil before returning to FC Dinamo Batumi in January 2002.

Gvianidze played for PFC Botev Plovdiv during the 2002–03 and 2003–04 seasons.

References

External links

1974 births
Living people
Footballers from Georgia (country)
Expatriate footballers from Georgia (country)
FC Nyva Ternopil players
Botev Plovdiv players
FC Guria Lanchkhuti players
FC Dinamo Batumi players
Ukrainian Premier League players
First Professional Football League (Bulgaria) players
Expatriate footballers in Ukraine
Expatriate sportspeople from Georgia (country) in Ukraine
Expatriate footballers in Bulgaria
Association football defenders